"Côte Ouest" is a song by French hip hop band 47Ter, released on June 25, 2019 from her EP L'adresse.

Music video
As of February 2023, the music video for Côte Ouest had over 7 million views on YouTube.

Charts

Certifications

References

2019 songs
2019 singles
Country rap songs
Country pop songs
Surf songs
Synth-pop songs